Matawatchan Aerodrome  is an aerodrome located  northeast of Matawatchan, Ontario, Canada.

References

Registered aerodromes in Ontario
Buildings and structures in Renfrew County
Transport in Renfrew County